Robert Pearsall may refer to:

 Robert Lucas de Pearsall (1795–1856), English composer
 Robert Pearsall (architect) (1852–1929), English architect